Western is a station on the Chicago Transit Authority's 'L' system, serving the Pink Line. It is located in the Heart of Chicago and Heart of Italy neighborhoods in the Lower West Side community area. The station was originally built in 1896 as part of the Metropolitan West Side Elevated Railroad's Douglas Park branch. It was rebuilt around 1935, and again between 2002 and 2004. It is located near Metra's Western Avenue & 18th Place (Metra) station on the BNSF Railway Line.

Bus connections
CTA
  49 Western (Owl Service) 
  X49 Western Express (Weekday Rush Hours only)

Notes and references

Notes

References

External links

Western (Cermak Branch) Station Page
Western Avenue entrance from Google Maps Street View

CTA Pink Line stations
Railway stations in the United States opened in 1896
Lower West Side, Chicago